In mathematics, a Lehmer sequence is a generalization of a Lucas sequence.

Algebraic relations

If a and b are complex numbers with

under the following conditions:

 Q and R are relatively prime nonzero integers
  is not a root of unity.

Then, the corresponding Lehmer numbers are:

for n odd, and

for n even.

Their companion numbers are:

for n odd and

for n even.

Recurrence 

Lehmer numbers form a linear recurrence relation with

with initial values . Similarly the companion sequence satisfies

with initial values

Reference

Integer sequences